Myrmecia can refer to:
 Myrmecia (alga), genus of algae associated with lichens
 Myrmecia (ant), genus of ants called bulldog ants
 Myrmecia (skin), a kind of deep wart on the human hands or feet

See also
 Copromorpha myrmecias or C. myrmecias, a species of moth
 Myrmeciinae, a subfamily of ant